Heinrich Behmann (10 January 1891, in Bremen-Aumund – 3 February 1970, in Bremen-Aumund) was a German mathematician. He performed research in the field of set theory and predicate logic.

Behmann studied mathematics in Tübingen, Leipzig and Göttingen. During World War I, he was wounded and received the Iron Cross 2nd Class. David Hilbert supervised the preparation of his doctoral thesis, Die Antinomie der transfiniten Zahl und ihre Auflösung durch die Theorie von Russell und Whitehead. In 1922 Behmann proved that the monadic predicate calculus is decidable. In 1938 he obtained a professorial chair in mathematics at Halle (Saale). In 1945 he was dismissed for having been a member of the NSDAP.

External links
 Biography (in German)
 
 

1891 births
1970 deaths
20th-century German mathematicians
Scientists from Bremen
Recipients of the Iron Cross (1914), 2nd class
German logicians
German philosophers
University of Tübingen alumni
Leipzig University alumni
University of Göttingen alumni
Academic staff of the Martin Luther University of Halle-Wittenberg
Nazi Party members